Ephestiodes infimella is a moth of the family Pyralidae described by Émile Louis Ragonot in 1887. It is native to North America, where it is mostly found in the eastern United States from Maryland to Florida, west to Texas, north to southern Ontario. It is an introduced species in Hawaii.

The wingspan is about 11 mm. They have slender light brown forewings with yellowish shading in the basal third and darker reddish brown in distal two-thirds. The hindwings are much wider than the forewings and are pale gray with a brown terminal line and long pale fringe scales. Adults are on wing from June to September in Maryland.

External links
Images at the Moth Photographers Group of Mississippi State University
Bug Guide

Moths described in 1887
Phycitinae
Taxa named by Émile Louis Ragonot